YDT may refer to:
 Boundary Bay Airport near Vancouver, Canada
 Yard Diving Tender, a type of diving support vessel
 Yukon Daylight Time, no longer observed; see Yukon Time Zone